Tras La Tormenta It is the fifth and last studio album made between the American singer Willie Colón and the Panamian Songwriter Rubén Blades. It was released on January 31, 1995 through Sony Tropical, Epic Records and Columbia Records. Recorded at Acme Recordings Studios, being the last great collaboration that the two artists did. It had four singles, "Talento De Televisión", "Homenaje A Héctor Lavoe", "Tras La Tormenta" and "Como Un Huracán", being the first mentioned the most awarded of the album.

It Is considered by experts as one of the most successful salsa albums. They were also nominated for in the 38th Annual Grammy Awards for Grammy Award For Best Tropical Latin Album and reached the third spot in Billboard's Tropical Albums chart. Also As one of his four singles It is found as the opening theme of the album, "Tribute to Héctor Lavoe" that for almost a minute you can hear the trombone that brought Willie Colón to fame, along with Héctor Lavoe, during their period as duo, was composed by Colón himself, Amilcar Boscán and Cucco Peña.

Background 
It was recorded after a long fight between Blades and Colon, which was due to Blades disagreement with the album The Last Fight (1984), both came with great albums behind their backs such as "Hecho En Puerto Rico" by Colón Published By Sony Music in 1993, "Amor Y Control" with Blades In 1992 also with Sony Music. although in songs like "Doña Lele" and "Tras La Tormenta" it is shown how they interact with the trombone and you of Blades, at no time during the recording did they share a studio, something they did not do until 2003 to celebrate the 20 Years of Their Album musical "Siembra".

Sony Music Intervention 
The intervention of Sony Music was proposed in a humorous way by Blades himself, due to his intention to thank Colón for entering him into the world of music in 1977 with his album "Metiendo Mano!", although Colón accepted the project did not come out as expected being in different studios at the time of recording the album.

Singles

Talento De Televisión 
It was written by Amílcar Boscán inspired by the actress Yuyito, saying that it was born from "everyday phenomena that are usually forgotten". He also said that when he watched television in the 90s there was a Venezuelan television program called "Super Sábado Sensacional"  where the Argentine model "Yuyito" was, who is really Amalia González.It was also said that it was Jennifer López but it was ruled out by Amílcar Boscán himself.

Homenaje A Héctor Lavoe 
This is the song where the album opens. Fingering the trombone for 40 seconds where Colón and Lavoe leaned on to achieve fame.

Track listing 
This list has been adapted from Apple Music.

Staff 
Musicians and general producers,adapted from AudioKat:

Performers credits

Technicals credits

References

Sony Music albums
Salsa albums
1995 albums
Willie Colón albums
Rubén Blades albums
Sony Music Latin albums
Epic Records albums
Albums produced by Willie Colón